Grimoald, Grimald, Grimoart, Grimwald, Grimuald, or Grimbald is a Germanic personal name.

It may refer to:

Personal name

Grimoald I of Benevento, duke of Benevento (651–662) and king of the Lombards (662–671)
Grimoald II of Benevento, duke of Benevento (677–680)
Grimoald III of Benevento, duke of Benevento (787–806)
Grimoald IV of Benevento, duke of Benevento (806–817)
Grimoald of Bavaria, duke of Bavaria (715–725)
Grimoald, son of Tassilo II
Grimoald I the Elder, Mayor of the Palace of Austrasia (643–656)
Grimoald II the Younger, Mayor of the Palace of Neustria and Burgundy (695–714)
Grimoald Alferanites, Prince of Bari (1121–1132)
Grimoaldo of the Purification (1883–1902), a religious and clerical student of the Passionist Congregation
Grimoart Gausmar, 12th-century troubadour
Grimoaldus, 12th-century saint
Grimbald, 9th-century saint

Surname

Nicholas Grimald (1519–1562), English poet
Guillaume Grimoard, better known as Pope Urban V

See also
 Grimoard & Grimaud (disambiguation), related surnames
 Grimaldo (disambiguation) & Grimaldi (disambiguation), Romance-language forms of the name Grimwald